A list of films produced by the Marathi language film industry based in Maharashtra in the year 1910–1919.

1910-1919 Releases
A list of Marathi films released in 1910–1919.

References

1910-1919
 
1910s in Indian cinema